D'Rhys Miller is a Fiji international rugby league footballer who plays as a  forward for the Western Suburbs Magpies in the Canterbury Cup NSW.

Career
Miller made his international debut for Fiji in their 56–14 victory vs Lebanon in the 2019 Pacific Test.

On 28 November 2019, Miller signed a contract to join Canterbury Cup NSW side North Sydney after departing Wentworthville.

References

External links
Wentworthville Magpies profile
Fiji profile

1995 births
Living people
Fiji national rugby league team players
Newtown Jets NSW Cup players
Rugby league players from Sydney
Rugby league second-rows
Wentworthville Magpies players